Stefan Kolb (born 22 January 1991) is a German football striker who plays for TSV Neudrossenfeld.

Career 
Kolb began his career with Sportring Bayreuth before he moved to FSV Bayreuth in summer 2001. After six years playing for FSV Bayreuth's youth team he left for FC Carl Zeiss Jena in summer 2007. After 23 games in two years he was promoted to the 3. Liga team and  made his debut on 29 August 2009 against VfL Osnabrück and scored his first goal on 5 September 2009 against Holstein Kiel which was the deciding one. After four years with Carl Zeiss Jena and his first professional season he signed on 3 July 2010 with Greuther Fürth.

References

External links 
 

1991 births
Living people
Sportspeople from Bayreuth
German footballers
Association football forwards
3. Liga players
FC Carl Zeiss Jena players
SpVgg Greuther Fürth players
Footballers from Bavaria